Eugene Daub (born November 13, 1942) is an American contemporary figure sculptor, best known for his portraits and figurative monument sculpture created in the classic heroic style. His sculptures reside in three of the nation's state capitals and in the National Statuary Hall in the United States Capitol. His work appears in public monuments and permanent collections in the United States and Europe.

Early life and education
Eugene Daub was born in Pottstown, Pennsylvania. His education includes: Pennsylvania Academy of the Fine Arts, Philadelphia; The Johnson Atelier Technical Institute of Sculpture, New Jersey; Rutgers University, New Jersey; and the Academy of Art College, San Francisco.

Personal life
Eugene Daub is married to artist Anne Daub.

Career
Eugene Daub began his career as an art director for an advertising firm. His first job in sculpture was for The Franklin Mint where he developed skills in relief sculpture.

He taught at the Academy of Art University in San Francisco, Ca from 1993 to 2007. He has been an instructor at the Scottsdale Artists’ School from 1991 to present and is the designer of the first Philadelphia Liberty Medal, which that city awards every year to a champion of world peace.

Daub has exhibited extensively and has works in numerous public collections, including the Helsinki Art Museum, the British Museum; the Smithsonian Institution; The National Statuary Hall Collection in the United States Capitol and the United States National Park Service.

Daub has created over 40 major monuments in the U.S. in the last 30 years. He is also one of the pioneer members of the American Medallic Sculpture Association, which pushed American contemporary medallic art into the international contemporary movement.

He won both of the nation's highest awards for excellence in medallic art: The Saltus Award from the American Numismatic Society, and the gold medal, from the American Numismatic Association.

Daub is a Fellow of the National Sculpture Society.

In 2004, Daub joined sculptor Rob Firmin to form Daub & Firmin Sculpture Studios, LLC, where Daub serves as master artist and principal sculptor, and Firmin serves as designer, sculptor, historian, and proposal creator.

Rosa Parks statue

In December 2009, the firm of Daub and Firmin won the design competition to create a Rosa Parks statue for the U.S. Capitol. Eugene Daub was the principal sculptor of the Rosa Parks statue. Daub collaborated with partner Rob Firmin on the concept and pedestal for the statue.
The statue of Rosa Parks is historically significant as being the first full-length statue of an African American person in the U.S. Capitol. It is also the first statue commissioned by the Congress since 1873.

Numismatic work
Eugene Daub is Vice President and Past President of the American Medallic Sculpture Association. He is one of the early pioneers of the AMSA that pushed American medallic art into the contemporary world. Daub is the first sculptor since Daniel Chester French, in 1919, to have sculpted more than one medal for the American Numismatic Society.

Notable medals

Statue of Liberty Medal, American Numismatic Society 1986
Philadelphia Liberty Medal, 1986
Helsinki delegation medal, FIDEM convention 1991
Crazy Horse, first issued medal of the American Medallic Sculpture Association, 1987
Fire and Ice, #121 medal of the Society of Medalist, 1992
Discovery Medal, Brookgreen Sculpture Gardens, 1993
Wildwood Medal, Little Rock Arkansas, 1988
Kavli Prize Medallion, 2009
Lewis and Clark, Montana Historical Society, 2006
100th Anniversary Medal, New York Numismatic Club, 2008
Ruth Bader Ginsburg medallion, Jewish American Hall of Fame, 2012
Ratification Medal, United States Capital Historical Society, 1988

Awards
Saltus Award1991. The Saltus Awardis the highest national and international recognition of the American Numismatic Association for excellence in medallic sculpture.
Gold medal, from the American Numismatic Association for lifetime achievement in Medallic Sculpture.
He is a Fellow of the National Sculpture Society.
Daub was awarded the Arthur Ross Award in 2002 by the Institute of Classical Architecture and Art.
Best Historical Sculpture award, Oakland Museum of California, California Arts Club, 2006
Best in Show Sculpture, Fallbrook Art Center, 2008
Elliot Gantz Foundry Award, Portrait Sculpture, 79th annual NSS exhibition, 2012 
Agop Agopoff Memorial Prize, 2013
In September 2012 Daub was awarded an Honorary Doctorate of Human Letters from the Academy of Art University, San Francisco.
Medal of Honor, National Sculpture Society, 2014. The Medal of Honor is the society's highest award, presented for notable achievement in and for the encouragement of American sculpture.

Sculptures
Partial Portfolio
Corps of Discovery statue commemorating the Lewis and Clark expedition in Kansas City, Missouri.
Phinneas Banning Monument, Banning Landing, Wilmington, California 2002.
Monument to General Bernard Adolph Schriever, Los Angeles Air Force Base, 2007.
USS San Diego Memorial, San Diego Harbor, in collaboration with Lou Quaintance, 2008.
Henry W. and Marion Bloch Memorial Statue, University of Missouri, Kansas City, 2013.

The following works below are commissions by Daub & Firmin LLC. Eugene Daub and Rob Firmin collaborate on the concept, design and sculpting. Eugene Daub was the principal sculptor of the maquette and the final sculptures.
Rosa Parks statue for the U.S. Capitol.
Abraham Lincoln as a Boy in Hodgenville, Kentucky depicts Lincoln shortly before his family moved from his nearby birthplace to Indiana. 
Harvey Milk in San Francisco City Hall.
Statue of Thomas Jefferson located at the University of Virginia.sculpture of Thomas Jefferson displayed on the grounds of the University of Virginia, based on events of a specific day as described in an unpublished history dissertation Firmin discovered at the university. 
Allegories of Civilization, Utah State Capitol, 2013.  
National Salute to Bob Hope and the Military, San Diego, 2008.

References

External links
Eugene Daub from Daub & Firmin Sculpture Studios.
Eugene Daub from Scottsdale Artists School.
Eugene Daub from Art & Design Online.

Living people
American male sculptors
Pennsylvania Academy of the Fine Arts alumni
Pennsylvania Academy of the Fine Arts faculty
American medallists
1942 births
Academy of Art University faculty
20th-century American sculptors
21st-century American sculptors
21st-century American male artists
People from Pottstown, Pennsylvania
Sculptors from Pennsylvania
20th-century American male artists